The Shoestring Glacier is a small valley glacier, stretching out from the  peak of Mount St. Helens in Skamania county in southwest Washington in the United States. The source of the glacier was an ice and snow field on the summit of the mountain. 75% of the glacier's volume was removed through the volcanic activity of Saint Helens, creating deadly lahars down the mountainside. The glacier has also created a truncated spur on the mountain.

References

See also
List of glaciers in the United States
Mount St. Helens

Glaciers of Mount St. Helens
Gifford Pinchot National Forest
Glaciers of Washington (state)